Christina Seufert Sholtis (born Christina Anne Seufert; January 13, 1957, in Sacramento, California) and raised in Ambler Pennsylvania is an Olympic diver from the USA. Seafert qualified for the 1980 U.S. Olympic team but did not compete due to the U.S. Olympic Committee's boycott of the 1980 Summer Olympics in Moscow, Russia. She was one of 461 athletes to receive a Congressional Gold Medal instead. She dove for the US at the 1984 Olympics, where she won a bronze medal in the Women's 3m Springboard event.

She went to school and dove for the University of Michigan. She was inducted into the schools' Hall of Honor in 2007.

In 2012, she served as one of the judges for Diving at the 2012 Olympics.

References

External links
 

1957 births
Living people
Congressional Gold Medal recipients
Divers at the 1984 Summer Olympics
Olympic bronze medalists for the United States in diving
Michigan Wolverines women's divers
Sportspeople from Sacramento, California
American female divers
Medalists at the 1984 Summer Olympics
World Aquatics Championships medalists in diving
Competitors at the 1977 Summer Universiade
American referees and umpires